Altanbulag ("golden spring") is a sum (district) of Selenge Province in northern Mongolia.  It is located about 25 km from the provincial capital of Sükhbaatar, on the border with Russia opposite the town of Kyakhta. Altanbulag is the location of the Altanbulag Free Trade Zone (Altanbulag qudaldaany çölööt büs).

History
Altanbulag began as a trading outpost across the Kyakhta River from the Russian town of Kyakhta during Qing rule of Mongolia in 1730. The name of that city was called Maimaicheng (Mongolian: Худалдаачин, English: City of Buying and Selling) at the first and later renamed to Kyakhta (Mongolian: Khiagt). Also people used other names such as "Mongolian Khyahta" and "Southern Kyakhata".  

Following the Treaty of Kyakhta in 1727 each side built a trading post on its side of the border. Construction began in 1730. It was perhaps 500 to 700 feet south of Kyakhta, upstream on the small Kyakhta River. The town was square, with wooden walls and, after 1756, a three-foot wide ditch. Each wall had a gate which led to two major streets which intersected in the center. Each gate had a 25-foot watchtower manned by members of the Mongol garrison. The main avenues were about 25 feet wide, but the other streets and alleys were narrow. The larger houses had interior courtyards where trading was done. These courtyards were generally better kept than the public areas. The southwestern quarter of town was occupied by "Bukharans" as the Russians called traders from Central Asia. Women were forbidden to live in the town, apparently to keep Chinese merchants from becoming permanent residents.  The rule was evaded but still in force in 1908. The post was administered by the 'Dzgarguchei' who was replaced by the Lifanyuan every two years. For some purposes the Dzarguchei dealt with the Tushetu Khan in Urga who was partly supervised by a Manchu resident.

On 13 March 1921, a Soviet-backed People's Provisional Government of Mongolia was established at Altanbulag.  This government went on to oust the government of Roman Ungern von Sternberg and later formed the Mongolian People's Republic in 1924.

Names

Today, the town is known as Altanbulag in both the Mongolian and Buryat languages.

During the Qing dynasty, the town was known as Maimachen (etc.;  in Russian), City of Buying and Selling in English) which derived from the Chinese name . In Mongolian, it was known as Övör Khiagt  (Өвөр Хиагт, South Kyakhta).

See also
Kyakhta trade

References
Clifford M. Foust, "Muscovite and Mandarin: Russia's Trade with China and its Setting, 1727–1805, 1969

External links
 Altanbulag Free Trade Zone

Populated places in Mongolia
Districts of Selenge Province
Mongolia–Russia border crossings